90elf.de, launched on 13 August 2008, was a commercial German language Internet radio station which specialized in broadcasting football matches.
In some German regions 90elf could also be received by cable or DVB-T. Since August 2011 90elf could be received via Digital Audio Broadcasting.
The slogan of the station was 90elf - Your football radio.

The station stopped broadcasting on June 2, 2013, after losing the rights to the Bundesliga.

The station's name derives from the normal length of a football game (90 minutes) and the number of players in a football team (German: elf, "eleven").

Programming
The main part of the programme was the live coverage of matches of the German Bundesliga, the 2. Bundesliga (second division) and several German Cup matches. When not broadcasting live football action, 90elf offered German football fans regular national and international football news updates, football-themed magazines and radio talk shows.

References

External links
 90elf website

Internet radio in Germany
Defunct radio stations in Germany
Radio stations established in 2008
Radio stations disestablished in 2014